The Flakpanzer IV Kugelblitz (German for "ball lightning") was a German self-propelled anti-aircraft gun developed during World War II. By the end of the war, only a pilot production of five units had been completed. Unlike earlier self-propelled anti-aircraft guns, it had a fully enclosed, rotating turret.

Development
The need for a specialised self-propelled anti-aircraft gun, capable of keeping up with the armoured divisions, had become increasingly urgent for the German Armed Forces, as from 1943 on the German Air Force was less and less able to protect itself against enemy fighter bombers.

Therefore, a multitude of improvised and specially designed self-propelled anti-aircraft guns were built, many on the Panzer IV chassis, starting with the Flakpanzer IV Möbelwagen (a stopgap design) and progressing through the Wirbelwind and Ostwind models. However, these designs were tall, open-topped designs with sub-optimal armor. These flaws were to be eliminated in the Kugelblitz, the final development of the Flakpanzer IV.

The first proposal for the Kugelblitz envisioned mounting a modified anti-aircraft turret developed for U-boats on the Panzer IV chassis, which was armed with dual 30 mm MK 303 Brünn guns (a configuration known as Doppelflak, "dual flak"). This was however abandoned as impractical, as development of this gun had not yet been completed, and in any case the entire production run of this gun turret was reserved for Nazi Germany's Kriegsmarine.

Instead, the Kugelblitz used the 30 mm MK 103/Pz cannon in a Zwillingsflak ("twin flak") 103/38 arrangement. The MK 103 had also been fitted in single mounts to such planes as the Henschel Hs 129 in a ventral gun pod, and to the twin-engined Dornier Do 335. Each 30mm gun could fire 450 rounds a minute.

The Kugelblitz combined the chassis and basic superstructure of the Panzer IV tank with a newly designed oscillating turret. This turret was fully enclosed, with overhead protection and 360° traverse. Mass production was planned, but never happened due to the disruption by Allied bombing efforts.

As production of the Panzer IV was about to be terminated further work was under way to change to the Jagdpanzer 38(t) Hetzer chassis which was in turn based on the Panzer 38(t). No prototypes based on Hetzer hulls were completed.

Service
The Kugelblitz was not yet out of development when the war ended. Only five prototypes were built. It is unclear what happened to the few Kugelblitzes which were built.

Survivors
Today, one complete Kugelblitz turret is exhibited at the Lehrsammlung der Heeresflugabwehrschule (collection of the German army anti-aircraft school), Rendsburg. An incomplete Kugelblitz cradle also exists (without the turret itself), but is in a private collection.

Comparable vehicles
 40M Nimród
 Crusader Mk. III Anti-Aircraft Tank Mk. I
 M19 Multiple Gun Motor Carriage
 ZSU-37

Notes

Sources
"Vor 60 Jahren: Die Kämpfe um Horchen, Spichra und Creuzburg - Teil 2" (in German). Milan.de. Retrieved 2011-07-17.
Spielberger, Walter J., and Uwe Feist. Sturmartillerie. Fallbrook, CA: Aero, 1967.
German Tanks of World War II: The Complete Illustrated history of German Armoured Fighting Vehicles 1926-1945, F. M. von Senger und Etterlin, translated by J. Lucas, Galahad Books, New York, 1969, 
 Chamberlain, Peter & Doyle, Hilary (1999) "Encyclopedia Of German Tanks Of World War Two"
 Karl R. Pawlas: The 3 cm Flak 103/38 and 103/Pz part 1-5 , in "Waffen Revue Volume 93-96", Journal Verlag Schwend GmbH, Schwäbisch Hall 1994-1995

Further reading

External links
Information about the Kugelblitz at Panzerworld
Information about the Kugelblitz at Achtung Panzer

World War II self-propelled anti-aircraft weapons of Germany
30 mm artillery
Research and development in Nazi Germany